CFXO-FM is a Canadian radio station that broadcasts a country format at 99.7 FM in High River, Alberta. The station is branded as 99.7 Sun Country and is owned by Golden West Broadcasting.

The station began broadcasting on October 30, 2007.

External links
Sun Country 99.7
 
English-language FM radio station in High River/Okotoks - Broadcasting Decision CRTC 2006-330
 

Fxo
Fxo
Fxo
High River
Radio stations established in 2007
2007 establishments in Alberta